Babis Taouxis (1930 – 2006) was a Greek footballer. He played in three matches for the Greece national football team from 1954 to 1955. He was also part of Greece's team for their qualification matches for the 1954 FIFA World Cup.

References

External links
 

1930 births
2006 deaths
Greek footballers
Greece international footballers
Place of birth missing
Association footballers not categorized by position